Irishtown is a townland in Mullingar in County Westmeath, Ireland.

The townland is located to the north of the town, to the south of Lough Owel. St Finian's College stands on the townland.

References 

Townlands of County Westmeath